A true-breeding organism, sometimes also called a purebred (biology slang: pure line or true-breeding line), is an organism that always passes down certain phenotypic traits (i.e. physically expressed traits) to its offspring of many generations. An organism is referred to as true breeding for each trait to which this applies, and the term "true-breeding" is also used to describe individual genetic traits.

In Mendelian genetics, this means that an organism must be homozygous for every trait for which it is considered true breeding; that is, the pairs of alleles that express a given trait are the same.  In a purebred strain or breed, the goal is that the organism will "breed true" for the breed-relevant traits.

Apomixis and parthenogenesis, types of asexual reproduction, also result in true breeding, although the organisms are usually not homozygous.

Examples
A purebred variety of cat, such as Siamese, only produces kittens with Siamese characteristics because their ancestors were inbred until they were homozygous for all of the genes that produce the physical characteristics and temperament associated with the Siamese breed.

Apples are notorious for not breeding true from seed, which means that they are propagated by grafting. The same is true of many fruit and nut trees. Many commercially produced plants for gardeners are F1 hybrids, which if propagated from seed will produce F2 hydrids which are quite different from their parents; the F1 hybrids therefore don't breed true.

See also
 Inbreeding
 Homozygous
 Test cross
 Purebred

References

Classical genetics